Langshan or Mount Lang is a mountain and a scenic area in Xinning County, Hunan, China. It is described on the local signage as a "world famous UNESCO geopark of China" and was inscribed as part of the China Danxia World Heritage Site in 2010 because of its unique geological formations and spectacular scenery.

History
In 2000, it has been designated as a "National Rock Climbing Training Base" by the General Administration of Sport of China.

In October 2001, it was classified as a "National Geological Park" by the Ministry of Land and Resources.

In May 2002, it was authorized as a "National Key Scenic Spot".

On January 16, 2006, it was inscribed to the National Natural Heritage List by the Ministry of Construction.

In 2010, it was categorized as an AAAA level tourist site by the China National Tourism Administration. 

In the 2010 UNESCO list of world heritage sites, Langshan was designated a natural World Heritage Site as part of China's Danxia landform.

On August 3, 2016, it has been categorized as an AAAAA level tourist site by the China National Tourism Administration.

Natural history
Within the boundaries of the area, the following number of species are known to live: 26 species of mammals, 94 species of birds, 35 species of reptiles, 19 species of amphibians, 36 species of fish, about 816 species of insects, over 1,421 vascular plants species and 150 fungus

Rivers
Fuyi River, a tributary of Zi River, flow through the area.

Tourist attractions
 Pepper Peak and Camel Peak Scenic Area
 Danxia Linear Valley
 The First Line in the World

Gallery

References

Langshan
Danxia landform